Hejmdal is a facility in Aarhus, Denmark owned by The Danish Cancer Society and used to counsel and house cancer patients and their families. The building is situated in the Trøjborg neighborhood on Peter Sabroe's Gade 1. Hejmdal was originally a part of Aarhus Municipal Hospital but has since been renovated. The American architect Frank Gehry worked pro bono on the redesign with the architect company Cubo Architects from Aarhus.

History 
The building was originally the home of the porter of Aarhus Municipal Hospital. In 2008 it was renovated the Danish Cancer Society established a facility for cancer counselling and housing cancer patients and their families during treatments. The American architect Frank Gehry and the Aarhus firm Cubo Architects worked on the redesign. Hejmdal is named for the Norse god Heimdallr, god of sunlight and guardian of Bifrost. The house is designed as an open space without boundaries.

External links 
 Official website
 Hejmdal on Wikimedia Commons

References 

Buildings and structures in Aarhus
1908 establishments in Denmark